Adrian Karl Quist (23 January 191317 November 1991) was an Australian tennis player.

Biography
Adrian Quist was born in Medindie, South Australia. His father was Karl Quist, who had been a noted interstate cricketer, and owned a sporting goods store at the time of his son's birth. Quist grew up in Adelaide and once played Harry Hopman, but lost, having given Hopman a head start. He was a three-time Australian Championships men's singles champion but is primarily remembered today as a great doubles player. He won 10 consecutive Australian doubles titles between 1936 and 1950, the last eight together with John Bromwich and he was also one of the winners of a "Career Doubles Slam". Quist was ranked World No. 3 in singles in 1939 and World No. 4 in 1936.

In his 1979 autobiography tennis great Jack Kramer writes that in doubles "Quist played the backhand court. He had a dink backhand that was better for doubles than singles, and a classic forehand drive with a natural sink. He was also fine at the net, volley and forehand."

After retiring from playing the game, Quist became a journalist, best known for his articles in The Sydney Morning Herald.

Quist was inducted into the International Tennis Hall of Fame in Newport, Rhode Island, in 1984.

Adrian Quist also held the most Davis Cup victories by any Australian until Lleyton Hewitt surpassed that record on 18 September 2010 in Cairns.

He died in Sydney, New South Wales in 1991, aged 78.

Adrian Quist is the uncle of fashion designer Neville Quist, founding director of Saville Row.

Grand Slam finals

Singles (3 titles, 1 runner-up)

Doubles: (14 titles, 4 runner-ups)

Mixed Doubles: (1 runner-up)

References

External links 
 
 
 
 
 

1913 births
1991 deaths
Australian Championships (tennis) champions
Australian Championships (tennis) junior champions
Australian male tennis players
Australian people of Danish descent
French Championships (tennis) champions
International Tennis Hall of Fame inductees
Tennis people from South Australia
United States National champions (tennis)
Wimbledon champions (pre-Open Era)
Grand Slam (tennis) champions in men's singles
Grand Slam (tennis) champions in men's doubles
Grand Slam (tennis) champions in boys' singles
Grand Slam (tennis) champions in boys' doubles
Sport Australia Hall of Fame inductees